Narsinh Mehta is a 1932 Gujarati biographical film directed by Nanubhai Vakil. It was the first Gujarati talkie film.

Plot
The film is based on the life of the saint-poet Narsinh Mehta.

Cast
The cast was:
 Master Manhar as Narsinh Mehta
 Umakant Desai as Krishna
 Mohan Lala as Ra Mandlik
 Khatun as Kunwarbai
 Master Bachu as Kunwarbai's husband
 Miss Jamna as Manekbai
 Miss Mehtab as Rukmini

Marutirao, Trikam Das and Miss Devi appeared in other roles.

Production
The sets were designed by Ravishankar Raval.

Criticism
According to Anandshankar Dhruv, the film adhered to a Gandhian interpretation of Narsinh Mehta. The film was devoid of miracles associated with him.

References

External links
 

1932 films
Indian black-and-white films
1930s Gujarati-language films
Films shot in Gujarat
Cultural history of Gujarat
Indian biographical films
1930s biographical films
Films based on Indian folklore
Films directed by Nanubhai Vakil
Biographical films about poets